(born October 11, 1990) is a Japanese singer-songwriter signed to Avex Trax. Born and raised in Osaka, Okumura started to write lyrics and compose music at the age of five after attending music competitions. On September 5, 2007, she debuted with the single "Koi, Hanabi".

History 
 By grade five, Okumura had attended many music contests and started to write lyrics and music.
 Attended Littlecat music school in Osaka before debut.
 While attending school, Okumura continued to create music and to attend live events. She once attended the convention live "Showcase Live" by avex, where her performance was highly recognized.
 Major debuted with single  in 2007. Since she attends school in Osaka, all the promotional events occur inside Osaka.

Discography

Albums 
 2008: Arigatō

Singles 
 2007: "Koi, Hanabi"
 2008: "Suna"
 2008: "Honto wa ne"
 2009:  feat. Ken the 390
 2009:  feat. Ken the 390
 2010:

Digital Releases 
 2008.04.23 "Sotsugyō (Mata, Aō ne)"

References

External links 
 Official website 
 Official blog 
 Official website (heretofore) 

1990 births
Japanese women pop singers
Japanese women singer-songwriters
Japanese singer-songwriters
Avex Group artists
Living people
Musicians from Osaka
21st-century Japanese singers
21st-century Japanese women singers